Bellegrove, originally known as Belleview, is a residential village in North Annville Township, Lebanon County, Pennsylvania, United States.

Geography of Lebanon County, Pennsylvania